The Battle of the Elleporus was fought in 389 BC between the forces of Dionysius I of Syracuse and the armies of the Italiote League.  The armies of Syracuse triumphed, and Dionysius' control was extended into Southern Italy.

After arriving in Italy, with a force of 20,000 men, 3000 horses, and a fleet of 40 galleys, Dionysius decided to lay siege to Caulonia, a city belonging to Locri. The two armies were ignorant of each other's whereabouts until Dionysius acquired intelligence about Heloris's whereabouts from one of his scouts. Exploiting the advantage he ordered his forces to surprise attack the enemy at the dawn. Dionysius used his overwhelming numerical superiority to form a tight noose around their group. The disorganized and scattered forces of Heloris become easy prey to Dionysius's well organized phalanx, the Greeks fled after hearing that their leader Heloris had fallen, the fleeing Greeks sought refuge on a hill, but were surrounded by Dionysius later 10,000 Greeks surrendered. Dionysius I of Syracuse successfully managed to conquer southern Italy (Magna Graecia), crushing the Italiote (Greek) League and Heloris at the Battle of the Elleporus.

See also
 Magna Graecia

Notes

References
Tucker, Spencer C. (2010). A Global Chronology of Conflict: from the Ancient World to the Modern Middle East; Volume I: ca. 3000 BCE - 1499 CE. Santa Barbara, Denver, Oxford: ABC-CLIO. .

External links

the Elleporus
Elleporus
389 BC
Magna Graecia